F2G may refer to:

Eberhart F2G, a circa 1920's aircraft
Goodyear F2G Corsair, a circa 1940's aircraft